Watching Ellie is an American television sitcom that stars Julia Louis-Dreyfus and was created by her husband, Brad Hall and aired on NBC from February 26, 2002 to May 20, 2003. Sixteen episodes were broadcast before it was canceled due to low ratings.

Premise and formats 
There were two incarnations of Watching Ellie. Both focused on the character of cabaret singer Ellie Riggs (Louis-Dreyfus), with markedly different approaches.

The first was directed by Ken Kwapis, known for his innovative work in single-camera sitcoms such as The Larry Sanders Show, Malcolm in the Middle and The Bernie Mac Show.  Each 22-minute episode was meant to portray a 22-minute slice of Ellie's life, in real time.  In the earliest episodes, a clock was even shown in the corner of the screen.  Louis-Dreyfus stated in 2003 that the clock was Jeff Zucker's idea. Thirteen episodes were filmed, but only ten aired before the series was put on indefinite hiatus (the remaining first-season episodes have never aired).

Nearly a full year later, the show reappeared as a more traditional sitcom, with multiple cameras and a live studio audience plus an added laugh track.  This version fared even worse than its predecessor and was canceled after six episodes.

Cast 
 Julia Louis-Dreyfus – Ellie Riggs
 Lauren Bowles – Susan
 Steve Carell – Edgar
 Darren Boyd – Ben
 Peter Stormare – Ingvar
 Don Lake – Dr. Zimmerman

Production
Louis-Dreyfus and Hall earned salaries of $350,000 each per episode and their contracts stipulated 15 episodes per season, rather than the usual 22. Carsey-Werner-Mandabach Productions, the original production company, dropped out because of the high costs and was replaced by NBC Studios.

The show was pitched to ABC, CBS, Fox and HBO, who all turned down the series.

Louis-Dreyfus and Bowles played sisters and they're also half-sisters in real life.

Episodes

Season 1 (2002)

Season 2 (2003)

References

External links
 

2002 American television series debuts
2003 American television series endings
2000s American sitcoms
NBC original programming
Television series by Universal Television
English-language television shows